Gerard Whateley is a Melbourne-based sports broadcaster and writer. Since January 2018 he has been chief sports caller and host of the Whateley program on the sports radio station SEN1116. He is also co-host of Fox Footy's AFL 360 program and an occasional sports columnist for the Herald Sun newspaper.

Career

Whateley started his media career at the Herald Sun newspaper. He spent six years at the paper during which he gained experience including police rounds, courts and state politics. He was also involved in the research of the Herald Suns hardback book Our Home Front, documenting life in Australia during the Second World War from the newspapers of the time. Whateley became the paper's movie writer, then editor of HIT magazine (the Herald Suns movie and music lift out), prior to being appointed senior writer for the newly released Sunday Magazine in 1998. Whateley travelled to the US and Europe, interviewing some of the world's famous people including Steven Spielberg, Leonardo DiCaprio, Kevin Spacey, Morgan Freeman, Geoffrey Rush and Cindy Crawford. During this time, he was heard for the first time on the Australian Broadcasting Corporation (ABC) with a weekly segment reviewing videos on the afternoon program.

Whateley began to focus more on sports, writing regular in-depth features and gaining access to the likes of Wayne Carey, Greg Norman, Damien Oliver and Jacques Villeneuve along with covering football as a "second job" for the Sunday Herald Sun.

At the beginning of 1999, Whateley took up the job as the network's senior sport reporter for Channel Ten. His chief responsibilities were to cover the Australian Football League (AFL) and horse racing. At the completion of his first year, he was named the Young Journalist of the Year at the Melbourne Press Club's Quill Awards. He was also named the Network Ten Young Achiever of the Year from nationwide consideration of employees. Whateley earned a reputation for authority and accuracy, enhanced at the 2000 Olympics breaking a series of stories surrounding the drug use by competing weightlifters.

In 2001, Whateley accepted the chief reporter's position at Seven News, winning the Quill Award for the Most Outstanding News Report for an investigation that revealed a wanted US criminal had lied to enter Australia to win a Melbourne radio station's Valentine's Day competition.

Soon after, Ten reclaimed Whateley's services to be a foundation member of the network's AFL commentary team. He later joined ABC Radio's AFL team. In his inaugural year calling football, Whateley was named the Australian Football Media Association's Most Outstanding Radio Caller, following in the footsteps of Tim Lane. Throughout this time, Whateley's horse-racing work in print, radio and television was rewarded with numerous awards, including the 2004 Cox Plate Story of the Year for the ABC.

Whateley joined the ABC full-time in September 2004, as lead sports broadcaster in Melbourne, and a national caller of several sports including AFL, cricket, horse racing and Olympic swimming.

Whateley was a regular panelist and occasional replacement host on the ABC's Sunday morning sports show Offsiders since its inception in 2005. He became the show's host from the beginning of the 2014 season and continued in the role until his departure from the ABC at the end of 2017.

In January 2018, it was announced that Whateley was departing ABC to join Melbourne sports radio station SEN 1116, where he would become chief sports caller and host of a new weekday morning program called Whateley. The Whateley program debuted on 29 January 2018. Whateley's first interview on the new program was with Australian former tennis champion Rod Laver, discussing the previous evening's Australian Open tennis final. The same edition of the program also featured an interview with 2018 Australian Open men's champion Roger Federer.

Whateley hosts Fox Footy's AFL 360 television program, which normally screens at 7.30 pm each Monday to Wednesday during the AFL season. His co-host is Herald Sun chief football writer Mark Robinson. Whateley and Robinson began presenting the show on its debut in 2010 as a weekly program on Wednesday nights on the Fox Sports channel. In 2012, as a part of Foxtel's enhanced coverage in the new AFL broadcast rights deal, the program expanded to the Monday to Thursday schedule on the relaunched AFL-dedicated channel Fox Footy. The show was named Most Outstanding Program at the Australian Football Media Association Awards in 2012, 2013 2015 and 2016.

Publications

In 2012, Whateley wrote a book about Australian thoroughbred racehorse Black Caviar, Black Caviar: The Horse of a Lifetime. Later that year, Whateley rejoined the Herald Sun as a columnist.

Awards

Whateley was the winner of the Australian Football Media Association's "Alf Brown Trophy", awarded to the most outstanding media performer, in 2015 and 2017.

Personal life

Whateley first met his wife, Claire, when they were teenagers at their local church in the south-eastern Melbourne suburb of Mulgrave. They have three children.

Whateley supports the Geelong Football Club.

References

External links
Whateley's profile on the ABC website

Australian radio personalities
Radio personalities from Melbourne
Australian rules football commentators
Living people
Australian television talk show hosts
Year of birth missing (living people)